Diethylstilbestrol dipropionate (DESDP) (brand names Agostilben, Biokeral, Clinestrol, Cyclen, Estilbin, Estril, Neobenzoestrol, Orestol, Oroestrol, Ostregenin, Prostilbene, Stilbestriol DP, Stilboestrolum Dipropionicum, Stilboestrol, Synestrin, Willestrol, others), or diethylstilbestrol dipropanoate, also known as stilboestrol dipropionate, is a synthetic nonsteroidal estrogen of the stilbestrol group that was formerly marketed widely throughout Europe. It is an ester of diethylstilbestrol with propionic acid, and is more slowly absorbed in the body than diethylstilbestrol. The medication has been said to be one of the most potent estrogens known.

The medication has been available in both oral and intramuscular formulations.

See also 
 List of estrogen esters § Diethylstilbestrol esters
 List of sex-hormonal aqueous suspensions

References 

Estrogen esters
Estrogens
Phenols
Propionate esters
Stilbenoids